Jean Charles Coquerel (2 December 1822 – 12 April 1867) was a French navy surgeon, algologist, and entomologist.

Coquerel collected insects in Madagascar and neighbouring islands. A number of these were described after his death by Léon Fairmaire in his Notes sur les Coléopteres recueillis par Charles Coquerel a Madagascar et sur les côtes d'Afrique (1869). During his lifetime Coquerel wrote a number of articles and books, including an appendix on insects in Auguste Vinson's Voyage à Madagascar au couronnement de Radama II (1865).

A number of animals are named after him, including the Coquerel's coua (Coua coquereli Grandidier, 1867), the Coquerel's sifaka (Propithecus coquereli Milne-Edwards, 1867), and the Coquerel's giant mouse lemur (Mirza coquereli Grandidier, 1867), each of these species is endemic to Madagascar.

Coquerel's insect collection is in the Muséum national d'histoire naturelle in Paris.

References 

Lhoste, J. 1987 Les entomologistes français. 1750 - 1950.  INRA (Institut National de la Recherche Agronomique), Paris : 1-355 328
Marseul, S. A. de 1889: Les Entomologistes et leurs Écrits.  L'Abeille (5) 26(=2) 224-286 284-286, Schr.verz.
Papavero, N. 1971: Essays on the history of Neotropical dipterology. São Paulo 194-195
Viette, P. 1962: [Coquerel, J. C.] Ann. Soc. Ent. Fr. 131 8

1822 births
1867 deaths
French entomologists
19th-century French botanists